Braeburn Lodge is a roadhouse on the Klondike Highway in the Yukon Territory of Canada. It is located east of Braeburn Lake and north of Braeburn Mountain, on the path of the former Dawson Overland Trail, which was built in 1902 between Whitehorse and Dawson City. The lodge itself is a tourist destination and is famous for its large cinnamon buns. Nearby Cinnamon Bun Airport is named for the lodge's cinnamon buns. Every February, Braeburn Lodge hosts a checkpoint of the long-distance Yukon Quest sled dog race.

Climate

References 

Buildings and structures in Yukon